Kunsthalle Helsinki is a non-profit exhibition space founded by various Finnish artist and art associations in 1928. Presenting annually 5–7 major exhibitions and special events, the main focus of the exhibition programme lies in contemporary art, as well as design and architecture.  The Kunsthalle has been a central place for changing exhibitions since the beginning, and does not hold a permanent collection.

The Kunsthalle building was designed by Hilding Ekelund and Jarl Eklund. Completed in 1928, the building is a prime example of Nordic Classicism in Finland. The building has been renovated several times and the latest major refurbishment was completed in 2009.

See also
 Kunsthalle
 Töölö Church

References

External links
 Kunsthalle Helsinki

Culture in Helsinki
Art museums and galleries in Finland
Neoclassical architecture in Finland
Hilding Ekelund buildings
1928 establishments in Finland
Museums established in 1928